Liu Yang (born 6 October 1978) is a Chinese military transport pilot and taikonaut who served as a crew member on the space mission Shenzhou 9. On 16 June 2012, Liu became the first Chinese woman in space.

Biography 
Liu was born in Zhengzhou, Henan province in 1978, into a worker's family of Linzhou, Anyang origin. She graduated from PLA Air Force Aviation University in Changchun.

Liu joined the PLA Air Force in 1997 and qualified as a pilot before becoming the deputy head of a flight unit, holding the PLAAF rank of major. She is a veteran pilot with 1,680 hours of flying experience. After two years of astronaut training, Liu excelled in testing before being selected with another woman, Wang Yaping, as a candidate for the astronaut corps.

Liu was selected for the crew of Shenzhou 9, the first crewed mission to the Chinese space station Tiangong 1, along with Jing Haipeng, the first repeat Chinese space traveller, and Liu Wang. Liu became the first female Chinese astronaut to go into space. The mission was launched on June 16, 2012, 49 years to the day after the first female space traveller, cosmonaut Valentina Tereshkova was launched. During this crewed space mission, Liu performed experiments in space medicine.

On June 5, 2022, Liu launched aboard Shenzhou 14 to the Tiangong space station for a mission and stay to last about 6 months. She carried out her first spacewalk on 1 September 2022, becoming the second Chinese woman to conduct one.

Personal life 
Liu is a member of the Chinese Communist Party. She is married and has no siblings. In February 2015, it was confirmed that she had given birth, but no further information was given about her child. The news agency Xinhua reported a former spaceflight official as claiming that marriage was a requirement for all female Chinese astronauts due to concerns that spaceflight could potentially harm women's fertility and also "married women would be more physically and psychologically mature." However, this requirement has been officially denied by the director of the China Astronaut Centre, stating that this is a preference but not a strict limitation.

Liu has been described as an eloquent speaker, an avid reader and also a lover of cooking.

See also 
 Women in space
 Valentina Tereshkova
 Sally Ride
 Chinese women in space
 Wang Yaping

References

External links 

 Spacefacts biography of Liu Yang
 The History of Liu Yang and her Family [simplified Chinese]

 

1978 births
People from Zhengzhou
People's Liberation Army Astronaut Corps
Women astronauts
Shenzhou program astronauts
Living people
People's Liberation Army Air Force personnel
Chinese women aviators
PLA Air Force Aviation University alumni
All-China Women's Federation people
Spacewalkers